The Discovery and Basic Configuration Protocol (DCP) is a protocol definition within the PROFINET context. It is a link layer  based protocol to configure station names and IP addresses. It is restricted to one subnet and mainly used in small and medium applications without an installed DHCP server.

References

External links
https://gitlab.com/wireshark/wireshark/-/wikis/PROFINET/DCP

Link protocols